Yoon Hyung-joon (Hangul: 윤형준), better known by his stage name Hangzoo (Hangul: 행주), is a South Korean rapper and member of Rhythm Power. He was the winner of Show Me the Money 6. He released his first album, Best Driver, on 25 August 2015.

Discography

Extended plays

Singles

References

Living people
South Korean male rappers
South Korean hip hop singers
21st-century South Korean male  singers
1986 births
Show Me the Money (South Korean TV series) contestants